Senator Babcock may refer to:

George R. Babcock (1806–1876), New York State Senate
Robert S. Babcock (1915–1985), Vermont State Senate